The cryptic anglerfish (Histiophryne cryptacanthus) is a frogfish found in waters ranging from Taiwan to South Australia.  There are an estimated 75 specimens known.  The luring appendage on its forehead is reduced to nearly nothing.

References 

Lophiiformes
Fish of Australia
Fish of Taiwan
Fish described in 1913